"Better Days" is a song by Australian singer-songwriter Pete Murray. It was released on 5 September 2005 as the lead single from his third studio album, See the Sun (2005). "Better Days" peaked at number 13 on the Australian ARIA Singles Chart and was certified gold. At the APRA Music Awards of 2006, the song was nominated for Song of the Year.

Track listing
Australian CD single
 "Better Days" – 3:46
 "Back On" – 3:34
 "Belong to Yesterday" – 3:26

Charts

Weekly charts

Year-end charts

Certifications

Release history

References

2005 singles
2005 songs
Columbia Records singles
Pete Murray (Australian singer-songwriter) songs
Songs written by Pete Murray (Australian singer-songwriter)